Malaysia participated in the 2007 Asian Indoor Games in Macau, China from 26 October to 3 November 2007.

Medallists

Malaysia at the Asian Indoor Games
Nations at the 2007 Asian Indoor Games
2007 in Malaysian sport